The royal coat of arms of the United Kingdom, or the royal arms for short, is the arms of dominion of the British monarch, currently King Charles III. These arms are used by the King in his official capacity as monarch of the United Kingdom. Variants of the royal arms are used by other members of the British royal family, by the Government of the United Kingdom in connection with the administration and government of the country, and some courts and legislatures in a number of Commonwealth realms. A Scottish version of the royal arms is used in and for Scotland. The arms in banner form serve as basis for the monarch's official flag, the Royal Standard.

In the standard variant used outside of Scotland, the shield is quartered, depicting in the first and fourth quarters the three passant guardant lions of England; in the second, the rampant lion and double tressure flory-counterflory of Scotland; and in the third, a harp for Ireland. The crest is a statant guardant lion wearing the St Edward's Crown, himself on another representation of that crown. The dexter supporter is a likewise crowned English lion; the sinister, a Scottish unicorn. The English and Scottish quarters and supporters are swapped in the Scottish version of the arms.

In the greenery below, a thistle, Tudor rose and shamrock are depicted, representing Scotland, England and Ireland respectively. This armorial achievement comprises the motto, in French, of English monarchs,  (God and my right), which has descended to the present royal family as well as the Garter circlet which surrounds the shield, inscribed with the Order's motto, in French,  (Shame on him who thinks evil of it). In the arms as used in Scotland, the Order of the Thistle's motto,  (No one provokes me with impunity) is used.
The official blazon of the royal arms is:

Following the death of Queen Elizabeth II, the design of King Charles III's royal cypher was announced on 27 September 2022, which featured the Tudor crown rather than the St Edward's Crown. According to the College of Arms, the Tudor crown should now be used in representations of the Royal Arms.

Uses
The royal arms appear in courtrooms, since the monarch is deemed to be the fount of judicial authority in the United Kingdom and law courts comprise part of the ancient royal court (thus so named). Judges are officially Crown representatives, demonstrated by the display of the royal arms behind the judge's bench in courts in England and Wales; which notable exceptions include the Supreme Court of the United Kingdom, which displays its own badge and flag to symbolize its nationwide role, the magistrates' court in the City of London, where behind the justices of the peace stands a sword upright flanked by the arms of the City and the Crown. In addition, the royal arms cannot be displayed in courtrooms or on court-house exteriors in Northern Ireland, except for the courtrooms of the Royal Courts of Justice in Belfast and the courts in Armagh, Banbridge, Downpatrick, Magherafelt, or Omagh, and the exterior of court buildings that had them in place prior to the 2002 law.

As the United Kingdom is governed in the monarch's name, the British government also uses the royal arms as a national symbol of the United Kingdom, and, in that capacity, the coat of arms can be seen on several government documents and forms, passports, in the entrance to embassies and consulates, etc. However, when used by the government and not by the monarch personally, the coat of arms is often represented without the helm. This is the case with both the Scottish and non-Scottish versions.

The royal arms have regularly appeared on the coinage produced by the Royal Mint including, for example, from 1663, the Guinea and, from 1983, the British one pound coin.  In 2008, a new series of designs for all seven coins of £1 and below was unveiled by the Royal Mint, every one of which is drawn from the royal arms.  The full royal arms appear on the one pound coin, and sections appear on each of the other six, such that they can be put together like a puzzle to make another complete representation of the royal arms. The series was replaced in 2016 by the Nations of the Crown bi-metallic coin.

The monarch grants royal warrants to select businesses and tradespeople which supply the Royal Household with goods or services. This entitles those businesses to display the royal arms on their packaging and stationery by way of advertising.

It is customary (but not mandatory) for churches throughout the United Kingdom whether in the Church of England or the Church of Scotland to display the royal arms to show loyalty to the Crown. If a church building of either denomination does not have a royal arms, permission from the Crown must be given before one can be used.

A banner of the royal arms, known as the Royal Standard, is flown from the royal palaces when the monarch is in residence, Windsor Castle and Buckingham Palace being principal abodes; and from public buildings only when the monarch is present. For instance, the Royal Standard only flies over the Palace of Westminster when the monarch is delivering the speech from the throne in the House of Lords at the State Opening of Parliament. This protocol equally applies to the monarch's principal residences in Scotland (the Palace of Holyroodhouse and Balmoral Castle), where the Royal Standard (Scottish version) is flown. When the monarch is not in residence the Union Flag, or in Scotland the ancient Royal Standard of Scotland, is flown.

The widely sold British newspaper The Times uses the Hanoverian royal arms as a logo, whereas its sister publication, The Sunday Times, displays the current version. Likewise, the Australian newspaper The Age and the New Zealand newspaper, The Press, uses the insignia as their logo.

The royal arms are also displayed in all courts in British Columbia, as well as in other Canadian provinces such as Ontario, where the judges are appointed by Crown authority. In Australia they were also displayed by all viceroys as representation of their Crown authority, and by most state supreme courts across the country. Additionally the Western Australian Legislative Council has also adopted them as its own symbol.

Scotland

Since the Union of the Crowns in 1603, a separate version of the royal arms has been used in Scotland, giving the Scottish elements pride of place.

The shield is quartered, depicting in the first and fourth quarters the lion rampant of Scotland; in the second, the three lions passant guardant of England; and in the third, the harp of Ireland.

The crest atop the Crown of Scotland is a red lion, seated and forward facing, itself wearing the Crown of Scotland and holding the two remaining elements of the Honours of Scotland, namely the Sword of State and the Sceptre of Scotland. This was also the crest used in the royal arms of the Kingdom of Scotland. The slogan, in Scots, appears above the crest, in the tradition of Scottish heraldry, and is an abbreviated form of the full motto: In My Defens God Me Defend.

The supporters change sides and both appear wearing the crowns of their respective Kingdom. The dexter supporter is a crowned and chained unicorn, symbolising Scotland. The sinister supporter is a crowned lion, symbolising England. Between each supporter and the shield is a lance displaying the flag of their respective Kingdom.

The coat also features both the motto Nemo me impune lacessit (No one wounds (touches) me with impunity) and, surrounding the shield, the collar of the Order of the Thistle. On the compartment are a number of thistles, Scotland's national flower.

England, Wales and Northern Ireland

Unlike the Acts of Union 1707 with Scotland, the Acts of Union 1800 with Ireland did not provide for a separate Irish version of the royal arms. The crest of the Kingdom of Ireland ("on a wreath Or and Azure, a tower triple-towered of the First, from the portal a hart springing Argent attired and unguled Or") has had little or no official use since the union.

The harp quarter of the royal arms represents Ireland on both the English and Scottish versions.  Likewise, one English quarter is retained in the Scottish version, and one Scottish quarter is retained in the English version.  Thus, England, Scotland and Ireland are represented in all versions of the royal arms since they came under one monarch. When the Irish Free State established its own diplomatic seals in the 1930s, the royal arms appearing on them varied from those on their UK equivalents by having the Irish arms in two-quarters and the English arms in one.

By contrast, there is no representation at all for Wales in the royal arms, as at the Act of Union 1707 Wales was an integral part of the Kingdom of England pursuant to the Laws in Wales Acts 1535 and 1542; thus, it has been argued Wales is represented in the English coat of arms. However the argument is somewhat disingenuous as in 1535 the Welsh Dragon was already part of the Tudor Coat of Arms. Upon the accession of the Tudor monarchs, who were themselves of Welsh descent, a Welsh Dragon was used as a supporter on the royal arms. This was dropped by their successors, the Scottish House of Stuart, who replaced the Tudors' dragon supporter with the Scottish unicorn.

In the 20th century, the arms of the principality of Wales were added as an inescutcheon to the coat of arms of the Prince of Wales, and a banner of those arms with a green inescutcheon bearing the prince's crown is flown as his personal standard in Wales.  The so-called Prince of Wales's feathers are a heraldic badge rather than a coat of arms upon a shield, but they are not Welsh in any case.  They derive, in fact, from the English Princes of Wales (who may owe them to an exploit of Edward, the Black Prince at the Battle of Crécy) and carry the motto  (German, "I Serve").  In any event, they do not form part of the royal arms, as opposed to the heraldic achievement of the Prince of Wales, who drops them upon his accession as king.

History

Kingdoms of England and Scotland
The current royal arms are a combination of the arms of the former kingdoms that make up the United Kingdom, and can be traced back to the first arms of the kings of England and kings of Scotland. Various alterations occurred over the years as the arms of other realms acquired or claimed by the kings were added to the royal arms. The table below tracks the changes in the royal arms from the original arms of King Richard I of England, and William I, King of Scots.

Union of the Crowns and the Commonwealth

After the Acts of Union 1707

Other variants

Royal family
Members of the British royal family are granted their own personal arms. In the past, the monarch's younger sons used various differences; and married daughters of the monarch impaled the plain royal arms with their husbands' arms. But for many centuries now, all members of the royal family have had differenced versions of the royal arms settled on them by royal warrant. Only children and grandchildren in the male line of the monarch are entitled to arms in this fashion: the arms of children of the monarch are differenced with a three-point label; while grandchildren of the monarch are differenced with a five-point label. An exception is made for the eldest son of the Prince of Wales, who also bears a three-point label. The labels are always white (argent) and each prince or princess has individual marks to form his or her particular difference, except the Prince of Wales, who uses a plain white three-pointed label. Since 1911, the arms of the Prince of Wales also displays an inescutcheon of the ancient arms of the Principality of Wales.

Queens consort and the wives of sons of the monarch also have their own personal coat of arms. Typically this will be the arms of their husband impaled with their own personal arms or those of their father, if armigerous. However, the consorts of a queen regnant are not entitled to use the royal arms. Thus Prince Philip, Duke of Edinburgh was granted his own personal arms. A notable exception to this rule was Prince Albert, who used the royal arms (differenced by a special label) quartered with his own Saxon royal arms.

Currently the following members of the royal family have their own arms based on the royal arms:

Government

Various versions of the royal arms are used by the Government of the United Kingdom, the Parliament of the United Kingdom and courts in some parts of the Commonwealth.

The UK Government generally uses a simplified version of the royal arms with a crown replacing the helm and crest, and with no compartment. In relation to Scotland, the Scotland Office and the Advocate General for Scotland use the Scottish version, again without the helm or crest, and the same was used as the day-to-day logo of the Scottish Executive until September 2007, when a rebranding exercise introduced the name Scottish Government, together with a revised logo incorporating the flag of Scotland. The Scottish Government continues to use the Arms on some official documents.

The simplified royal arms also feature:

 on all Acts of Parliament;
 on the cover of all UK passports and passports issued in other British territories and dependencies;
 as an inescutcheon on the diplomatic flags of British Ambassadors; and
 on all acts of the Anguilla House of Assembly, the Sovereign Base Areas, Pitcairn Islands and South Georgia and the South Sandwich Islands administrations;
 on The London Gazette.

Various courts in the Commonwealth also continue to use the royal arms:

 The Court of Appeal, Supreme Court and Provincial Court of British Columbia
 The Supreme Court of Newfoundland and Labrador and Court of Appeal of Newfoundland and Labrador
 The Supreme Court of the Yukon Territory
 The Supreme Court of South Australia
 The Supreme Court of Victoria

Furthermore:
 The crowned shield of the royal arms encircled by the Garter is used by the Home Office, by the Privy Council Office (United Kingdom), and by the Parliament of Victoria.
 The crowned shield of the royal arms is used by the Royal Mint.
 The royal arms with the crest but without the helm is used as the rank insignia for Class 1 Warrant Officers in His Majesty's Armed Forces.

Blazon 
This table breaks down the official blazons to enable comparison of the differences between the general coat and the coat used in Scotland.

See also 

Flag of the United Kingdom
Cadency labels of the British royal family
Armorial of the House of Plantagenet

Of all the Dominions only three retain elements from the British Coat of Arms:

Coat of arms of New Zealand
Arms of Canada
Coat of arms of Newfoundland and Labrador

Ireland uses the medieval arms of Ireland that are incorporated into the British Coat of Arms:
Coat of arms of Ireland

All other Dominions and former Dominions have changed their coat of arms:

Coat of arms of Australia
Coat of arms of South Africa
Emblem of India
Emblem of Sri Lanka

References

External links

 Number 10 Downing Street- Royal Coat of Arms
 Heraldica.org- The Royal Arms of Great Britain
 Government identity system HM Government

United Kingdom
 
British monarchy
United Kingdom
National symbols of the United Kingdom
United Kingdom
United Kingdom
United Kingdom
United Kingdom
United Kingdom
United Kingdom
United Kingdom
United Kingdom
United Kingdom
Church architecture
United Kingdom
United Kingdom